Keith E. Whittington (born 12 July 1968) is an American political scientist.

Whittington studied government, finance and business at the University of Texas at Austin, then earned a master's and doctoral degree in political science from Yale University.  He attended Katy High School where he graduated in the Class of 1986.

His teaching career began in 1995, with an assistant professorship at the Catholic University of America. He joined the Princeton University faculty in 1997. Whittington was promoted to associate professor in 2002, and became William Nelson Cromwell Professor of Politics by 2006. Whittington was elected a fellow of the American Academy of Arts and Sciences in 2012. In 2021, Whittington was appointed to the Presidential Commission on the Supreme Court of the United States.

He was the founding chair of the Academic Freedom Alliance and serves on its academic committee. He is a visiting fellow at the Hoover Institution. He has been a visiting professor at Harvard Law School, the Georgetown University Law Center, and the University of Texas School of Law. He is a blogger at the Volokh Conspiracy.

Selected publications
Gillman, Howard, Graber, Mark A., and Whittington, Keith E. (2021). American Constitutionalism. Third Edition. Oxford University Press. ISBN 0197527639
Whittington, Keith E. (2019). Repugnant Laws: Judicial Review of Acts of Congress from the Founding to the Present. University Press of Kansas. ISBN 0700627790.

Whittington, Keith E. (2016). American Political Thought: Readings and Materials. Oxford University Press. ISBN 0199338868.

References

1968 births
Living people
American political scientists
Yale Graduate School of Arts and Sciences alumni
Princeton University faculty
Catholic University of America faculty
University of Texas at Austin alumni
Fellows of the American Academy of Arts and Sciences